Alissa Turney (born April 3, 1984) was an American 17-year-old girl who was last seen in the Phoenix, Arizona area on May 17, 2001.

Background 
Alissa Turney lived in Paradise Valley, Arizona. At the time of her disappearance, she lived with her stepfather Michael Turney and half-sister Sarah Turney. She worked at the fast food restaurant Jack in the Box, and had a boyfriend.

Disappearance 
May 17, 2001 was the last day of Alissa's junior year at Paradise Valley High School. According to her stepfather, he dropped her off in the morning as usual, then picked her up around lunchtime. Allegedly, they had an argument and she stormed off. Later, he and Sarah found a note in her bedroom, allegedly written by her, claiming that she was running away to California. However, she had left her cell phone and other personal items behind. That night, Alissa had had plans to go to a party, but did not attend.

On May 24, 2001, Turney claimed that he received a phone call from a California number where Alissa swore at him before hanging up.

In 2008, Turney claimed that Alissa was killed by two "assassins" from the International Brotherhood of Electrical Workers and that she was buried in Desert Center, California.

Investigation 
Turney filed a missing persons report on May 17, 2001, but in the immediate days following Alissa's disappearance, police did not suspect foul play and no police investigation took place.

In 2006, self-proclaimed serial killer Thomas Albert Hymer told a prison guard that he had killed Alissa. He had been in prison since 2003 for an unrelated murder. However, when Phoenix police questioned Hymer, they ultimately determined that he had not had any contact with Alissa, and he admitted he might have confused her with a different victim.

In 2008, the case was reopened. In December 2008, detectives told Sarah that her father was their main suspect. Simultaneously, authorities were raiding the Turney home where they seized more than two dozen improvised explosive devices, 19 firearms, two homemade silencers, and a van full of gasoline. They also found a manifesto outlining his plans for a rampage against the International Brotherhood of Electrical Workers building in Phoenix. Michael Turney was arrested, prosecuted, and sentenced to 10 years in jail. He was released in August 2017.

In the media

Television 
Alissa's case was featured on an episode of 20/20 in October 2014, called "What Happened to Alissa?" in which Michael Turney repeatedly asserted his innocence.

Podcasts

Missing Alissa 
From July 2017 to January 2019, Phoenix resident and freelance journalist Ottavia Zappala released a podcast called Missing Alissa that explored the case, and interviewed some of Alissa's friends and family.

Voices for Justice 
In June 2019, Alissa's half-sister Sarah Turney, who was 12 in 2001, began a podcast called Voices for Justice that explored Alissa's disappearance and the subsequent police investigation. She drew upon over 3,000 pages of publicly released notes and case documents from the Phoenix Police Department. In April 2020, Sarah began posting about the case on TikTok, garnering millions of views.

After over 30 episodes about Alissa's case, in January 2021 the podcast transitioned covering other murder and missing persons cases in order to not jeopardize the ongoing investigation into Alissa's case.

Arrest 
In August 2020, Michael Turney was arrested in Mesa, Arizona. He was indicted and charged by a Maricopa County grand jury on second-degree murder charges in the death of Alissa.

Aftermath 
As of January 2023, Alissa's body has not yet been found.

References 

1984 births
2000s in Phoenix, Arizona
2000s missing person cases
2001 in Arizona
2010s in Phoenix, Arizona
Missing American children
Missing person cases in Arizona
People from Phoenix, Arizona
People from Paradise Valley, Arizona
May 2001 events in the United States
History of women in Arizona
Crime in Arizona
Living people